Auguste Édouard Cerfberr (1811, Épinal—1858) was a French author. Having completed his studies in law, Cerfberr entered the service of the government, in which he held many high positions. His last office was that of prefect and general inspector of the prisons at Grenoble. Cerfberr was the author of the following works:

Du Gouvernement d'Alger (Paris, 1834)
Des Sociétés de Bienfaisance Mutuelle, ou des Moyens d'Améliorer le Sort des Classes Ouvrières (Grenoble, 1836).
Projet d'établissement d'un pénitencier d'essai à Paris (Paris, 1840)

Bibliography
La Grande Encyclopèdie, s.v.

References

External links
 

1811 births
1858 deaths
19th-century French writers
Jewish French writers
19th-century French Jews
French male writers
19th-century French male writers